Proglucagon is a protein that is cleaved from preproglucagon. Preproglucagon in humans is encoded by the GCG gene.

Proglucagon is a precursor of glucagon, and several other components. It is generated in the alpha cells of the pancreas and in the intestinal L cells in the distal ileum and colon.  It is also cleaved into the following components in different organs:

 Signal peptide (1-20) – removed from preproglucagon to form proglucagon
 Glicentin (21–89)
 Glicentin-related pancreatic polypeptide (GRPP, 21-50)
 Oxyntomodulin (OXY or OXM, 53–89)
 Glucagon (53–81)
 Glucagon-like peptide 1 (GLP-1, 92–128) – first seven residues further cleaved
 Glucagon-like peptide 2 (GLP-2, 146–178)

Proglucagon itself is a protein with three repeats of slightly different secretin family hormones to be cleaved to form mature hormones.

References

Further reading

External links 
 
 
 
 

Pancreatic hormones
Precursor proteins